Dennis Wolf (ger. Dennis Wolf, rus. Деннис Вольф, born October 30, 1978) is a German IFBB professional bodybuilder.

Early life

Wolf was born to a German family in Tokmok in the Soviet Union (now in Kyrgyzstan). From 1989 to 1992, he resided in the Russian town of Topki. In 1992, he moved to the German town of Marl. Wolf took up martial arts, which led to his interest in weight training and bodybuilding. Later on, he decided to focus on bodybuilding and became a professional in 2005.

Career
Wolf is known for his small waist and big outer quad sweep. He received 4th place in the 2015 Mr. Olympia, and was the 2014 Arnold Classic champion.

Personal life
Wolf is fluent in English, German, and Russian. He is also making a video about bodybuilding in the Russian language for his Russian speaking fans.

Competitive history

Professional results
 2018 Arnold Classic – 12th place
 2015 EVL's Prague Pro – 4th place
 2015 Mr. Olympia – 4th place
 2014 San Marino Pro – 2nd place
 2014 EVLS Prague Pro – 1st place
 2014 Arnold Classic Europe  – 1st place
 2014 Mr. Olympia – 4th place
 2014 Arnold Classic – 1st place
 2013 Arnold Classic Europe – 3rd place
 2013 Mr. Olympia – 3rd place
 2012 EVLS Prague Pro – 1st place
 2012 Arnold Classic Europe 2012 – 2nd place
 2012 Mr. Olympia – 6th place
 2012 Arnold Classic – 2nd place
 2011 Sheru Classic – 5th place
 2011 Mr. Olympia – 5th place
 2011 Australian Pro – 1st place
 2011 Arnold Classic – 2nd place
 2011 Flex Pro – 4th place
 2010 Mr. Olympia – 5th place
 2010 NY Pro – 3rd place
 2009 Mr. Olympia – 16th place
 2008 Mr. Olympia – 4th place
 2007 Mr. Olympia – 5th place
 2007 Keystone Pro Classic – 1st place
 2007 New York Pro – 3rd place
 2006 Mr. Olympia – 16th place
 2006 Grand Prix Spain – 3rd place
 2006 Montreal Pro Championships – 5th place
 2006 Europa Supershow – 7th place

Amateur results
 2005 IFBB World Championship – 1st place and overall winner
 2005 WM-Qualifikation (IFBB) – 1st place
 2005 46 Deutsche Meisterschaft (IFBB) – 1st place heavyweight and overall winner
 2005 NRW-Landesmeisterschaft (IFBB)–- 1st place heavyweight and overall winner
 2005 Int. Hessischer Heavyweight Champion-Pokal – 2nd place
 2004 Deutsche Meisterschaft (Germering) (IFBB) – 2nd place
 2004 NRW-Landesmeisterschaft (IFBB) – 1st place heavyweight and overall winner
 2002 Belgium Grand Prix – 1st 
 2002 Mr. Universum (WPF) – Vice World Champion heavyweight
 2000 Internationale Deutsche Meisterschaft (IFBB) – 4th place heavyweight
 2000 NRW-Landesmeisterschaft (IFBB) – 1st place heavyweight and overall winner
 1999 NRW-Landesmeisterschaft  (IFBB) – 4th place heavyweight
 1999 Multipowerpokal (IFBB) – 4th place heavyweight
 1999 Newcomer (IFBB) – 2nd place heavyweight

References

External links
 Official Website
 Official Shop
 Official IFBB Pro Website

Bodybuilding
1978 births
Living people
German bodybuilders
Russian bodybuilders
Professional bodybuilders